Sebastian Alexander Brown (born 24 November 1989) is an English professional footballer who plays as a goalkeeper for Sutton United.

Career

Early years
Brown came through the youth system of Brentford, moving up from the under–18s squad to the first-team for the 2006–07 season. On 22 August 2006, Brown had his first involvement with the first-team squad at as an unused substitute, at the age of just 16, in the 4–3 penalty shoot-out victory over Swindon Town, after the game had ended 2–2 in normal time, in the First Round of the 2006–07 League Cup. At the end of the 2007–08 season he signed his first professional contract with the League Two club. Brown was loaned to Southern League First Division South & West club Windsor & Eton to gain first team experience, making 25 appearances for the club. Brown made his competitive debut for Brentford on 2 September 2008 in the First Round of the 2008–09 Football League Trophy against Yeovil Town, which ended 2–2 and went to a penalty shoot-out. Despite being only 18 at the time, Brown saved a crucial penalty by Andre McCollin to allow "The Bees" to triumph 4–2. Despite this, however, Brown was released by manager Andy Scott on 6 May 2009 along with eight other players having failed to break into the first team.

AFC Wimbledon
Brown joined AFC Wimbledon in 2009. On 21 May 2011, he saved two penalties for the club in the 2010–11 Conference play-off final penalty shoot-out as they beat Luton Town to gain promotion to the Football League. He was named as the goalkeeper for the 2010–11 Conference Team of the Year. On 19 February 2013, it was announced that Brown had joined Conference club Woking on an initial one-month loan deal. Following his release, Brown signed for ambitious Conference South club Bromley. Following the club's signing of Alan Julian in January 2015, however, Brown joined Whitehawk on a month's loan. After making just one appearance for the Hawks, Brown returned to Bromley, and joined Hampton & Richmond Borough on loan.

International career
Brown appeared twice for England C, playing in matches against Wales in 2010 and Belgium in 2011.

Coaching career 
In October 2016, Brown was announced as academy goalkeeping coach at AFC Wimbledon. He joined Sutton United as player-goalkeeping coach in 2017. In 2020 Brown announced that rather than returning to Plough Lane with the Dons, he would remain at Kingsmeadow and adopt a coaching role with the Chelsea Women’s Academy teams.

Personal life 
Brown has a PFA Sports Science degree from Roehampton University.

Brown got married in 2014 to an American Costume Designer - Kristen Ernst-Brown.

Career statistics

Honours
AFC Wimbledon
Conference Premier play-offs: 2011

Bromley

 Conference South: 2014–15

Hampton & Richmond Borough

 Isthmian League Premier Division: 2015–16

Individual

 Conference Premier Team of the Year: 2010–11

References

External links
 
 

1989 births
Living people
Footballers from Sutton, London
England semi-pro international footballers
Association football goalkeepers
Brentford F.C. players
St Albans City F.C. players
Windsor & Eton F.C. players
AFC Wimbledon players
Woking F.C. players
Bromley F.C. players
Whitehawk F.C. players
Hampton & Richmond Borough F.C. players
Grays Athletic F.C. players
Sutton United F.C. players
English Football League players
Southern Football League players
National League (English football) players
Isthmian League players
Tonbridge Angels F.C. players
Metropolitan Police F.C. players
Alumni of the University of Roehampton